

Campeonato 
New formula: 8 eight teams divided in two pools. The first two of each pool admitted to semifinals. The fourth teams to a play-out to avoid relegation.

Pool 1

Pool 2

Play Out 

 Noreste relegated (lost on aggregate 30-55)

Semifinals

Final

Ascenso
Sixteen team divided in 4 pools . The first two of each pool to play-offs

Pool 1

Pool 2

Pool 3

Pool 4

Playoffs 

Santa Fé promoted to "Campeonato"

External links 
  Memorias de la UAR 2005
  Francesco Volpe, Paolo Pacitti (Author), Rugby 2006, GTE Gruppo Editorale (2005)

Campeonato Argentino de Rugby
Argentina
Rugby